Antonio Fernando Díaz Bizcocho (born 3 August 1970 in Coria del Río, Andalusia), known as Antonio Fernando, is a Spanish retired footballer who played as a right back.

External links
 
 Beticopedia profile 
 Betisweb stats and bio 

1970 births
Living people
People from Coria del Río
Sportspeople from the Province of Seville
Spanish footballers
Footballers from Andalusia
Association football defenders
La Liga players
Segunda División players
Segunda División B players
Tercera División players
Betis Deportivo Balompié footballers
Real Betis players
Écija Balompié players
Recreativo de Huelva players
UD Almería players
CA Marbella footballers
Gimnástica de Torrelavega footballers
Spain youth international footballers
Spain under-23 international footballers